Gruenke may refer to:

 R v Gruenke, a leading Supreme Court of Canada case on privileged communications
 Bernard Gruenke, American stained glass artist
 B. Gunar Gruenke, American stained glass artist and grandson of the above

See also 
 Grünkern